is a Japanese isekai light novel series written by EDA and illustrated by Kochimo. It began serialization online in 2014 on the user-generated novel publishing website Shōsetsuka ni Narō. It was acquired by Hobby Japan, who published the first light novel volume in October 2015 under their HJ Novels imprint. Twenty-nine volumes have been released as of January 2023. A manga adaptation with art by Kochimo has been serialized online via Hobby Japan's Comic Fire website since 2018. Both the light novel and manga have been licensed in North America by J-Novel Club.

Premise 
Asuta Tsurumi is a Japanese teenager who manages a restaurant with his father. When a fire breaks out at the restaurant, Asuta enters the burning building to retrieve his father's cooking knife, and finds himself in another world with nothing but the clothes on his back and his father's knife. He encounters Ai Fa, a woman who is a member of a group of people living at the edge of a forest, and teaches the community about the value of well-cooked food using a boar-like animal known as giba.

Media

Light novels
The light novel series was originally published by EDA as a free-to-read web novel on Shōsetsuka ni Narō in 2014 and Hobby Japan published the first volume in print with illustrations by Kochimo in October 2015. As of January 19, 2023, twenty-nine volumes have been published. The light novel is licensed in North America by J-Novel Club. As of November 27, 2022, nineteen English volumes have been published.

Manga
The series was adapted into a manga series by Kochimo and published by Hobby Japan, with seven volumes released as of December 28, 2022. The manga is also licensed by J-Novel Club. As of January 11, 2022, six English volumes have been published.

Reception 
Rebecca Silverman of Anime News Network gave the first volume a grade of B−, praising its handling of cultural differences and the quality of the English translation. She wrote: "Cooking with Wild Game isn't the most thrilling of books, but it is setting up to perhaps spend more time on things that aren't excessive amounts of game-preparation... If you enjoy cooking stories, this is an interesting one, even if it has yet to achieve a perfect balance of its story elements."

References

External links
  at Shōsetsuka ni Narō 
  
  
 

2015 Japanese novels
Anime and manga based on light novels
Cooking in anime and manga
Hobby Japan manga
Isekai anime and manga
Isekai novels and light novels
Japanese webcomics
J-Novel Club books
Light novels
Light novels first published online
Romance anime and manga
Shōnen manga
Shōsetsuka ni Narō
Webcomics in print